Streptomyces wellingtoniae is a bacterium species from the genus of Streptomyces. Streptomyces wellingtoniae produces hygroscopin A, hygroscopin B and hygroscopin C.

See also 
 List of Streptomyces species

References

Further reading

External links
Type strain of Streptomyces wellingtoniae at BacDive – the Bacterial Diversity Metadatabase

wellingtoniae
Bacteria described in 2010